Sunnyvale is a suburb of West Auckland, New Zealand. Sunnyvale is under the local governance of Auckland Council. Sunnyvale used to be an orchard and wine growing area in Auckland with West Brook Wines founded there.

Geography

Sunnyvale is a suburb of West Auckland located north-west of the Waikumete Cemetery, due south of Henderson. Two of the major streams of West Auckland meet at Sunnyvale: the Oratia Stream and the Waikumete Stream, at McLaren Park.

Sunnyvale forms a part of the Waitematā lowland forests ecological zone. The free-draining soils and broad terraces provided a habitat that was ideal for large broadleaf trees, including pūriri, tōtara, karaka and tītoki.

History

Sunnyvale was a name originally used to refer to both Sunnyvale and Oratia, the rural locality to the south-west. Over time the name was exclusively applied to Sunnyvale. Sunnyvale used to be an orchard and wine growing area, and was the location where West Brook Wines was founded.

Demographics

Sunnyvale had a population of 7,326 at the 2018 New Zealand census, an increase of 1,026 people (16.3%) since the 2013 census, and an increase of 1,908 people (35.2%) since the 2006 census. There were 2,148 households, comprising 3,519 males and 3,807 females, giving a sex ratio of 0.92 males per female, with 1,740 people (23.8%) aged under 15 years, 1,740 (23.8%) aged 15 to 29, 3,195 (43.6%) aged 30 to 64, and 651 (8.9%) aged 65 or older.

Ethnicities were 44.8% European/Pākehā, 16.8% Māori, 25.6% Pacific peoples, 27.5% Asian, and 5.0% other ethnicities. People may identify with more than one ethnicity.

The percentage of people born overseas was 38.4, compared with 27.1% nationally.

Although some people chose not to answer the census's question about religious affiliation, 36.5% had no religion, 43.1% were Christian, 1.5% had Māori religious beliefs, 6.5% were Hindu, 3.7% were Muslim, 1.4% were Buddhist and 2.0% had other religions.

Of those at least 15 years old, 1,221 (21.9%) people had a bachelor's or higher degree, and 897 (16.1%) people had no formal qualifications. 732 people (13.1%) earned over $70,000 compared to 17.2% nationally. The employment status of those at least 15 was that 2,892 (51.8%) people were employed full-time, 741 (13.3%) were part-time, and 291 (5.2%) were unemployed.

Education
Local State primary and secondary schools include Sunnyvale Primary School, Holy Cross, Massey High School, Henderson High School, Liston College, and St Dominic's College.

References

External links
 Photographs of Sunnyvale held in Auckland Libraries' heritage collections.

Suburbs of Auckland
Henderson-Massey Local Board Area
West Auckland, New Zealand